Hogwood: a modern horror story is a 2020 documentary film focussing on an undercover investigation of a UK pig farm. The film was created by UK charity Viva!, directed by Tony Wardle and presented by Jerome Flynn.

The film explores issues with factory farming such as animal cruelty and disease outbreaks and suggests it is a leading cause of climate change.

Synopsis 
The documentary follows a team of undercover investigators as they explore Hogwood, a pig farm based in Warwickshire, England, as well as other farms in the UK. The footage shown throughout the film suggests evidence of overcrowding, mutilation, sick and injured pigs, dead pigs, and cannibalism.

Background 
Hogwood was a Red Tractor approved pig farm supplying UK supermarket Tesco and food producer Cranswick plc. 

Between 2017 and 2019, Viva! investigated Hogwood four times obtaining the footage shown in the 2020 documentary. During that time, Viva! held a number of protests including a nationwide day of action resulting in over 300 demonstrations outside Tesco stores to spread awareness to the public and put pressure on Tesco and Red Tractor to drop the farm as a supplier.

On 19 July 2019, in response to the footage obtained by Viva!'s fourth and final investigation, Red Tractor suspended Hogwood Farm's certification pending further investigation. Shortly afterwards, Tesco and Cranswick plc dropped Hogwood as a supplier.

Production 
The film was crowdfunded through Viva!’s website with 930 supporters contributing a total of £42,501, exceeding their target by 42%.

Broadcast and streaming 
The film was initially released in June 2020 on Amazon Prime Video, Apple TV, and Google Play. In October 2022, it was released on Netflix.

Featured individuals 

 Jerome Flynn (actor, singer, activist)
 Juliet Gellatley (activist, author)
 Joseph Poore (environmental researcher)
 Josh Cullimore (physician)
 Alice Brough (veterinarian, activist)

Awards and nominations

See also 

 List of vegan media
 Veganism
 Intensive animal farming
 Environmental impact of meat production

References 

2020 films
Pig farming